Yoshihama Station (吉浜駅) is the name of two train stations in Japan:

 Yoshihama Station (Aichi)
 Yoshihama Station (Iwate)